The Australian cricket team toured England in the 1964 season to play a five-match Test series against England for The Ashes. Australia won the series 1–0 with 4 matches drawn and therefore retained The Ashes.

Test series summary

First Test

Second Test

Third Test

In the decisive Third Test, Australia was 187–7 in reply to England's 268 when Ted Dexter decided to take the new ball. In response, Peter Burge, the last recognised batsman, went on the attack. He scored 160, well supported by Neil Hawke and Wally Grout, the last three wickets adding 211. This left England 121 behind on first innings and they could not recover.

Fourth Test

Since a draw in the Fourth Test would ensure that Australia would retain the Ashes, they batted on until they had reached 656-8 before declaring, with Bob Simpson scoring 311, belatedly his first Test century.  England responded with 611 (Ken Barrington 256, Ted Dexter 174) and the match ended in the dullest of draws.

Fifth Test

Ceylon
The Australians had a stopover in Colombo en route to England and played a one-day single-innings match there against the Ceylon national team, which at that time did not have Test status.

References

External links
 CricketArchive – tour summaries

Annual reviews
 Playfair Cricket Annual 1965
 Wisden Cricketers' Almanack 1965

Further reading
 Bill Frindall, The Wisden Book of Test Cricket 1877-1978, Wisden Group, 1979
 Chris Harte, A History of Australian Cricket, Andre Deutsch, 1993
 Ray Robinson, On Top Down Under: Cassell Australia (1975) .

1964 in Australian cricket
1964 in English cricket
1964 in Ceylon
1964
1964
International cricket competitions from 1960–61 to 1970
Sri Lankan cricket seasons from 1880–81 to 1971–72
1964